Beidahu ski area is a downhill ski resort located outside of Jilin City in Jilin province, China.  It is the site of the 2007 Winter Asian Games.  Intrawest has recently signed a letter of intent with the local government to assist in the development and operation of the area.

Buildings and structures in Jilin
Ski areas and resorts in China
Tourist attractions in Jilin
Sport in Jilin